Verity (alias Veretie, Verety, Verita, Veritie, etc.) is a female first name and a surname. As a first name it derives from the Latin feminine noun veritas, meaning "truth". It is thus an equivalent of Alethea, a female first name first used in England circa 1585, derived from the ancient and modern Greek feminine noun αλήθεια (pronounced "al-ee-thia"), meaning "truth". It was adopted in England as a Puritan  and Quaker virtue name, truthfulness being considered as a desirable attribute especially in a female, and following a new Protestant tradition of naming children after virtues instead of saints in order to avoid idolatry.

Verity is also a surname, which may have more ancient unrelated origins, possibly being a corruption of a similar word.

First name
Verity Crawley (born 1994), English professional bowler
Verity Barton (born 1985), Australian (Queensland) politician
Verity Firth (born 1973), Australian politician
Verity James, Australian TV and radio presenter
Verity Lambert (1935–2007), English television producer
Verity Rushworth (born 1985), English actress
Verity Sharp (born 1970), English broadcast radio personality
Verity Snook-Larby (born 1970), English race walker

Fictional characters 
Verity Poldark-Blamey, recurring character in the 2015 television series Poldark
Verity Price, character in the InCryptid novel series
Verity Simone Carlo, character in the IDW Publishing Transformers comic series

Surname
Anthony Verity (born 1939), English educationalist and classical scholar
Charlotte Verity (born 1954), British painter
Elsie Eleanor Verity (14 August 1894 – 1971), "The First Lady of the motor trade"
Hedley Verity (1905–1943), English cricketer
Jake Verity (born 1997), American football player
John Verity (born 1949), English guitarist
Ruggero Verity (1883–1959), Italian physician and entomologist
William Verity Jr. (1917–2007), American businessman and government official

Other
Verity (sculpture), a bronze statue made by Damien Hirst

References

Virtue names